Janez Porenta also known as Ivan Porenta, (3 June 1896 – 13 June 1942) was a Slovenian gymnast, competing for Yugoslavia. He won a bronze medal at the 1928 Summer Olympics.

Biography
Porenta was born in Ljubljana. He was a member of the Slovenian Sokol athletics movement. With the Yugoslav team, Porenta participated at two Olympic games, at the 1924 Summer Olympics in Paris and in 1928 Summer Olympics in Amsterdam. In Paris, he competed at nine events, his best results being 4th place in men's team competition and 6th place in horse vault. In Amsterdam, where the Yugoslav team won five medals in total, Porenta was a member of the bronze medal winning team at the team competition, together with Edvard Antosiewicz, Stane Derganc, Dragutin Ciotti, Boris Gregorka, Anton Malej, Jože Primožič, and Leon Štukelj.

During the Second World War, Porenta was active in the Liberation Front of the Slovene Nation. In 1942, he was arrested by the forces of Fascist Italy for involvement in the murder of the banker and businessman Avgust Praprotnik (1891–1942) and then shot at the Gramozna Jama ('gravel pit') site in Ljubljana.

References

1896 births
1942 deaths
Sportspeople from Ljubljana
Slovenian male artistic gymnasts
Yugoslav male artistic gymnasts
Olympic gymnasts of Yugoslavia
Olympic medalists in gymnastics
Olympic bronze medalists for Yugoslavia
Gymnasts at the 1928 Summer Olympics
Gymnasts at the 1924 Summer Olympics
Medalists at the 1928 Summer Olympics
Carniolan people
Executed Slovenian people
People executed by Italy by firing squad
Slovene resistance members